François Jacques Dominique Massieu (4 August 1832 – 5 February 1896) was a French thermodynamics engineer noted for his two 1869 characteristic functions, each of which known as a Massieu function (the first of which sometimes called free entropy), as cited by American engineer Willard Gibbs in his 1876 On the Equilibrium of Heterogeneous Substances.

References

External links
Nivoit, E. (1897). “Notice of the Life and Work of Mr. Massieu, Inspector General of Mines” (French → English), Annales des Mines, 9th Series, Vol. 11.

1832 births
1896 deaths
Thermodynamicists